Yogini Joglekar (6 Aug 1925 – 1 November 2005) was a Marathi writer, poet and also a classical singer.

Career
Yogini was born in Pune in 1925 and completed her school education in B.A. She was working as teacher between 1948 and 1953. She did a lot of social work through "Rashtrasevika Samiti". There are 116 books to her credit which includes 50 novels, 39 Short stories collection and many others like collection of poems, poems for children etc. Her novel "Ya sam Ha" on Bhaskarbuva Bakhale and "Ram Prahar" on Ram Marathe was special and got a lot of recognition.

She was learning classical singing since the age of 8 from Shankar buva Ashtekar and then from Ram Marathe. Also, she received classical music training for some period from Sangeetkalanidhi Master Krishnarao Phulambrikar. She sang for the Marathi film "Pahili Manglagaur" as a play back singer.

Books written
 Niragas  निरागस
 Shilangan शिलांगण 
 Kunasathi Konitari कुणासाठी कुणीतरी
 Jag जाग
 Chaitannya  चैतन्या
 Sakshatkar साक्षात्कार
 Umala उमाळा
 Chimakhade चिमखडे अर्थात बडबड गीते
 Upahar उपहार
 Swaha  स्वाहा
 Nadbrhma नादब्रह्म
 Paygun  पायगुण
 Aaswad आस्वाद
 Dahihandi दहीहंडी
 Sharyat शर्यत
 Shri Ganesha  श्रीगणेशा
 Navi Vaat नवी वाट
 Baplek बापलेक
 Ashwath अश्वत्थ
 Charuchi Aai चारूची आई

Articles
 Shravan

Songs written
 मधुर स्वरलहरी या  Madhur Swar Lahari Ya 
 सखे बाई सांगते मी Sakhe Bai Sangate Mi 
 हरीची ऐकताच मुरली Harichi Aikatach Murali 
 हे सागरा नीलांबरा He Sagara Nilambara

Personal life
In her memory, her family has released a Devnagari Unicode font "Aksharyogini". She died on 1 November 2005 at the age of 80 due to prolonged disease.

References

1925 births
2005 deaths
Women Hindustani musicians
Writers from Pune
Marathi-language singers
Indian women classical singers
Indian women poets
Performers of Hindu music
20th-century Indian singers
Hindustani singers
Marathi-language writers
20th-century Indian poets
20th-century Indian women writers
20th-century Indian women singers
Women writers from Maharashtra
Women musicians from Maharashtra
Singers from Pune